Riverton is an unincorporated community in Cherokee County, Kansas, United States.  As of the 2020 census, the population of the community and nearby areas was 771.  It is located at the junction of K-66 (former U.S. Route 66) and U.S. Route 69 Alternate and U.S. Route 400, near the Spring River. It is one of only three communities in Kansas along former U.S. Route 66.

History
The first post office in Riverton was established in 1919.

Geography
Riverton is located in southeastern Cherokee County near the southeastern corner of Kansas.

The eastern and southern edges of the CDP ars formed by the Spring River, which flows south to the Neosho River in Oklahoma. The CDP of Lowell is to the south across the Spring River.

Demographics

For statistical purposes, the United States Census Bureau has defined Riverton as a census-designated place (CDP).

Area attractions

The Eisler Brothers Country Store in Riverton was one of the stops on Pixar's US 66 research trips for the 2006 film Cars. The filmmakers met with Dean Walker, then president of the Kansas Route 66 Association, who is known to twist his feet backwards 180° and walk in reverse. He became one of many inspirations for the Mater character, a rusty old tow truck who teaches NASCAR rookie Lightning McQueen to drive in reverse.

The original boom truck is currently based at a restored Kan-O-Tex Service Station in nearby Galena.

Gallery

See also
 Rainbow Bridge (Kansas)
 U.S. Route 66 in Kansas

References

Further reading

External links
 USD 404, local school district
 Cherokee County maps: Current, Historic, KDOT

Census-designated places in Cherokee County, Kansas
U.S. Route 66 in Kansas
Census-designated places in Kansas